InMobi is an Indian multinational mobile advertising technology company, based in Bengaluru. Its mobile-first platform allows brands, developers and publishers to engage consumers through contextual mobile advertising.

The company was founded in 2007 under the name mKhoj by Naveen Tewari, Mohit Saxena, Amit Gupta and Abhay Singhal. In 2008, it was enhanced from SMS-based services to mobile advertising and rebranded as InMobi. In 2011, InMobi became the first Indian unicorn startup company. It has 22 offices in 12 countries across 5 continents and employs around 1,500 people.

The company is backed by Soft Bank, Kleiner Perkins Caufield & Byers and Ram Shriram's Sherpalo Ventures. esrnow a raised a total of US$215.6 million in three rounds of funding – US$0.5 million in 2007, US$7.1 million in Series A funding in 2008, US$8 million in Series B funding in 2010, US$200 million in Series C funding in 2011.

History
InMobi started in 2007, when it was known as mKhoj (mobile khoj), providing SMS-based search engine services. Started by the four founders out of a residential apartment in Bangalore, it has since grown into one of India's first unicorn companies. The founders later felt the need to rebrand to InMobi as the company shifted focus from mobile search to mobile advertising. "InMobi" was also thought to be easier to pronounce in English as compared to mKhoj – which is a derivative of the Hindi word for "search". The company initially operated in emerging markets in Asia and Africa, before expanding to the US in 2009.

Financing
The first round of funding of US$500 000 InMobi (then mKhoj) was from Mumbai Angels in August 2006. After rebranding the company from mKhoj to InMobi, they received Series A funding of US$7.1 million from Kleiner Perkins Caufield & Byers in 2008, and Series B funding to the tune of US$8 Million in 2010.

In 2011, the start-up raised US$200 million from Softbank. The investment was doled out in two tranches — US$100 million in 2011 and the rest in 2012.

Acquisitions and partnerships 
 In August 2011, InMobi acquired US-based mobile advertising provider Sprout, which was backed by Polaris Partners. Sprout, which provided the platform for creating HTML5 rich media advertising, was renamed InMobi Studio in 2012.
 InMobi had partnered with Amobee, end-to-end mobile advertising and services provider for a span of three years during which the company ran campaigns via InMobi's ad network.
 In July 2012, InMobi acquired MMTG Labs, a San Francisco-based start-up that operates Facebook apps marketplace Appbistro as well as white label app distribution platform AppGalleries. Per TechCrunch, the new platform AppGallery was the reason for InMobi acquisition of MMTG.  
 Post-MMTG acquisition, InMobi acquired Metaflow Solutions, a mobile app management and distribution company in the same year. This provides InMobi another platform to reach out to independent app developers and publishers. 
 In September 2015, InMobi entered a monetisation partnership with China-based APUS group, which allows users to customise their android screens. The partnership provides the company access to an estimated 500 million users in China as well as exclusive access to all APUS users in India.
 In October 2016, InMobi partnered with Moat, a New York-based SaaS analytics company to offer advertisers mobile video measurement and currency measurement through InMobi Exchange – which provides media buyers an extensive and diverse set of engaging mobile ad experiences through mobile native and mobile video formats and the InMobi network.
 InMobi partnered with Integral Ad Science in December 2016 to launch their Media Rating Council-accredited open source SDK code for mobile ad viewability. 
 In December 2016, InMobi also partnered exclusively with US-based Tapjoy, a mobile ads and app monetisation company with around 4 crore (40 million) unique users in India.
 In Jan 2018, InMobi acquired Los Angeles based Aerserv for US$90 Million in cash and stock to create the world's largest programmatic video platform for mobile publishers; making it InMobi's fifth and largest acquisition till date.
In June 2018, Microsoft Corp announced its global partnership with InMobi to enable new-age CMOs in make the shift from digital to mobile marketing.
In November 2019, InMobi's Glance (the mobile content platform and part of the InMobi Group) acquires short video content platform Roposo.
In December 2020, InMobi's Glance achieved unicorn status after US$145 funding from Google and existing investor Mithril Capital.
In October 2021, InMobi acquired UK-based Appsumer.

Mobile advertising 
The primary focus of InMobi has been on mobile advertising. The company's platform aims to bring together publishers and advertisers to provide relevant, personalised and contextual advertisements to a user visiting the mobile app or website.

Since the company's switch from an SMS-based search engine to an advertising platform, they have made several product announcements. The company started with simple text-based ads and has moved to include other ad formats such as video and native ads, including conventional ad formats such as interstitial and banner ads. The company also provides a Software Development Kit (SDK) for mobile app creators who wish to integrate InMobi's advertising within their app.

In 2014, InMobi launched their native advertising and interactive video advertising platforms.

InMobi has tied up with over 30,000 app developers, across verticals of gaming, social, news, utility, entertainment among others to help them monetize their apps using mobile advertising.

Native advertising 
InMobi launched their native advertising platform in 2014. Native advertising mimics the environment in which the ad is displayed thereby making it less intrusive to the end consumer.

Several advertising players had been increasing their focus on native ads to preserve the user experience on publishers’ websites and mobile apps by mimicking the environment in which they're displayed. This form of advertising also curtails the adoption of ad blockers as the ads are unobtrusive.

InMobi features 80 of the top 100 AdAge brands on their network, through which it provides a huge database for publishers to use their native advertising platform to monetise users.

Discovery-commerce, re-marketing and Miip 
InMobi launched a new platform called Miip in 2015. The platform brought together advertisers and publishers in a bid to spark excitement among online shoppers. It also enabled them to discover new products using the concept of re-marketing.

The remarketing platform enables app developers and marketers to retarget existing users across InMobi's global ad network and exchange by implementing a mobile growth strategy across the entire conversion funnel. The remarketing platform helps advertisers nudge users to make their first purchase, re-target existing users to drive incremental sales and re-activate dormant mobile users.

Awards and recognition 
 InMobi won the ‘NDTV Indian of the Year' award in 2016 
 InMobi was ranked 15th on the ‘World's Top 50 Innovative Companies 2016’ by Fast Company, a US-based business magazine. InMobi was also the number one company from India on the list ranked at 15th
 InMobi was featured amongst The Economic Times ‘India's best workplaces of 2016’ for workplace culture transformation. InMobi was amongst the ‘50 Disruptive companies 2013’ list by MIT Technology Review 
 InMobi won the bronze award in the category Enabling Technologies, Location based Advertising by Mobile Marketing Association (MMA), Global Smarties Awards 2015 in partnership with Unilever and Mindshare
InMobi named one among Fast Company- The World's Most Innovative Companies, 2016.
InMobi named on CNBC Disruptor 50 list for 2018.
InMobi named one among Fast Company- The World's Most Innovative Companies, 2018.
InMobi named on CNBC Disruptor 50 list for 2019.

Criticism 
According to sources, InMobi laid off approximately 10 per cent of its workforce in April 2016, due to the company reeling under losses of US$45.5 million in 2014-15 and US$40.91 million in 2015–16 in a bid to show profitability. The company also saw major attrition in their senior management during this phase.

InMobi has refuted the claims, by stating that they added 184 full employees in 2016 and their voluntary attrition rates are lower than the industry average with 80% of the executive team at InMobi has an average tenure of more than four years.

References

External links

Indian companies established in 2007
Software companies of India
Outsourcing companies
Companies based in Bangalore
Softbank portfolio companies
2007 establishments in Karnataka